Chryssa Kouveliotou is a Greek astrophysicist. She is a professor at George Washington University and a retired senior technologist in high-energy astrophysics at NASA's Marshall Space Flight Center in Huntsville, Alabama.

Early life and education
Kouveliotou received her bachelor's degree in physics from the National & Kapodistrian University of Athens, Greece, in 1975, and earned her master's degree in science from the University of Sussex, England, in 1977. She received her doctorate in astrophysics in 1981 from the Technical University of Munich, Germany, under the supervision of Klaus Pinkau. She was a faculty at the Dept. of Physics of the National & Kapodistrian University of Athens before pursuing research work in the United States.

Career 
Kouveliotou joined NASA Marshall Space Flight Center in 1991, initially supporting the Gamma Ray Astrophysics Team. Her numerous contributions to the fields of astronomy and astrophysics have expanded scientific understanding of fleeting, transient phenomena in the Milky Way galaxy and throughout the universe. Besides determining the unique properties of the highly energetic emissions from gamma-ray bursts – the brightest and most powerful cosmic events ever documented – Kouveliotou was part of the team which in 1997 revealed the extragalactic nature of these sources. In 1998, she and her team also made the first confirmed detection of ultra-dense neutron stars called magnetars – the cinders of stars left over after a supernova. In 2015 she moved as a Professor of Physics at George Washington University. She is currently the Chair of the Physics Department at GWU.

Awards 
In 2012 she received the Dannie Heineman Prize for Astrophysics as well as NASA Exceptional Service Medal, NASA's highest form of recognition awarded to a Government employee who, by distinguished service, ability, or vision has personally contributed to NASA's advancement of United States' interests; the same year she was named one of Time Magazine's 25 most influential people in space. In 2005, she received the NASA Space Act Award, which recognizes and rewards outstanding scientific or technical contributions significant to NASA's mission. In 2003, she shared the Bruno Rossi Prize for her work on magnetars, which awarded annually by the High Energy Astrophysics division of the American Astronomical Society. In 2002, she was the sole American representative on the international team which received the Descartes Prize in Astrophysics, which recognizes scientific breakthroughs from European collaborative research in any scientific field.

In 2013 she was elected as a member of the US National Academy of Sciences and in 2016 at the US Academy of Arts and Sciences. She was elected a foreign member of the Royal Netherlands Academy of Arts and Sciences in 2015 as well as a foreign member of the Academy of Athens (Greece) in 2016. In 2021 she was awarded the Shaw Prize (jointly with Victoria M. Kaspi).

In 2015 she received by the Greek Government the award of Commander of the Order of the Honor, for excellence in science.

She was elected a Legacy Fellow of the American Astronomical Society in 2020.  In 2022, she was elected member of the Scientific Council of the ERC.

Personal life 
Kouveliotou was married to fellow astrophysicist Jan van Paradijs.

References 

Year of birth missing (living people)
Living people
Alumni of the University of Sussex
American astrophysicists
Winners of the Dannie Heineman Prize for Astrophysics
Fellows of the American Academy of Arts and Sciences
Fellows of the American Physical Society
Members of the Royal Netherlands Academy of Arts and Sciences
Members of the United States National Academy of Sciences
Academic staff of the National and Kapodistrian University of Athens
George Washington University faculty
Greek emigrants to the United States
NASA astrophysicists
Columbian College of Arts and Sciences faculty
Fellows of the American Astronomical Society
Corresponding Members of the Academy of Athens (modern)
Scientists from Athens